The Deloitte Tower (French: Tour Deloitte) is a 26-storey office building in Montreal, Quebec, Canada, located between Windsor Station and the Bell Centre. It is the city's first privately owned and financed commercial office tower to be built in more than 20 years. It is named for professional services firm Deloitte, which occupies  of office space in the building. It also houses the headquarters of Rio Tinto, which relocated from the Maison Alcan. The Deloitte Tower is planned as part of a larger, multiphase, mixed use project that will include retail and residential spaces. The building is owned by Cadillac Fairview.

References

External links

Skyscrapers in Montreal
Downtown Montreal
Alcan
Skyscraper office buildings in Canada
Kohn Pedersen Fox buildings
Deloitte
Cadillac Fairview
Office buildings completed in 2015